Arteriviridae is a family of enveloped, positive-strand RNA viruses in the order Nidovirales which infect vertebrates. Host organisms include equids, pigs, Possums, nonhuman primates, and rodents. The family includes, for example, equine arteritis virus in horses which causes mild-to-severe respiratory disease and reproductive failure, porcine reproductive and respiratory syndrome virus type 1 and type 2 in pigs which causes a similar disease, simian hemorrhagic fever virus which causes a highly lethal fever, lactate dehydrogenase–elevating virus which affects mice, and wobbly possum disease virus.

Structure 
Member viruses are enveloped, spherical, and 45–60 nm in diameter.

Genome 
Arteriviruses have a positive-sense single-stranded RNA genome.

Taxonomy

The family Arteriviridae contains the subfamilies:
Crocarterivirinae
Equarterivirinae
Heroarterivirinae
Simarterivirinae
Variarterivirinae
Zealarterivirinae

References

 
Nidovirales
Virus families